Papaqucha (Quechua papa potato, qucha lake, "potato lake", Hispanicized spelling Papacocha) is a lake in Peru located in the Huancavelica Region, Huancavelica Province, Acobambilla District. It lies south of  Warmiqucha.

References 

Lakes of Peru
Lakes of Huancavelica Region